Pierpaolo Ficara (born 16 February 1992 in Syracuse) is an Italian cyclist, who currently rides for Italian amateur team Rolling Bike.

Major results

2015
 4th Gran Premio Industrie del Marmo
 10th Trofeo Edil C
2016
 4th Giro dell'Appennino
2017
 1st Fenkil Northern Red Sea Challenge
 2nd Overall Tour of Albania
1st  Points classification
1st Stage 1
 4th Overall Tour du Jura
1st Stage 2
 7th Pro Ötztaler 5500
2018
 3rd Overall Tour of Almaty
1st Mountains classification
 5th Coppa Ugo Agostoni
2019
 2nd Overall Tour de Savoie Mont-Blanc
 4th Giro della Toscana
 7th Overall Tour of Almaty
 7th Overall Sibiu Cycling Tour
 7th Mont Ventoux Dénivelé Challenge
2020
 4th Overall Tour de Langkawi
 6th Grand Prix Velo Alanya

References

External links

1992 births
Living people
Italian male cyclists
People from Syracuse, Sicily
Sportspeople from the Province of Syracuse
Cyclists from Sicily